Remember the Future (stylised in all caps) is the fourth studio album by Swedish singer Jonna Lee. It was released on 31 May 2019 by her own record label To whom it may concern. It has spawned the lead single "Open Sea" released on 8 February 2019, "Some Body" released on 26 April 2019 and "Remember the Future" released on 24 May 2019. It features contributions from her iamamiwhoami collaborator, Claes Björklund, as well as Röyksopp, Zola Jesus and Jennie Abrahamson.

Background and release
Lee has embarked on a tour promoting her album, Everyone Afraid to Be Forgotten. The artist stated that between shows "I found myself alone in my studio at every given chance, inspired from that whole synergy I experienced with the audience on stage."

On 3 February 2019, the artist announced the release date of the lead single, "Open Sea", released on 8 February 2019, alongside the new album, its title, release date, pre-order and North America tour dates.

In March 2019, Lee revealed the album's track listing and artwork as well as new tour dates.

On 17 April 2019, Jonna Lee announced the second single, "Some Body" released on 26 April 2019, preceding the album, alongside the video premiered on 25 April 2019 on the YouTube channel of iamamiwhoami.

Concept
Lee described Remember the Future as "visionary album of daring to dream, and shooting for the stars, despite the paradoxical underlying chafing knowledge that we're destroying our planet".

Artwork
The robot featured on the album cover was created by Lee. She portrayed it as "a retro space-age symbol of the visions of the past when people were dreaming of exploring the universe and the possibilities seemed endless."

Promotion
To promote the album, Lee embarked on a tour in United States and Canada. It began on 19 April 2019. The European leg of the tour was cancelled due to the artist's health issues.

Critical reception

Remember The Future received generally positive reviews from music critics. Eric Torres of Pitchfork stated that Lee "tilts her off-kilter electropop toward compellingly dystopian visions" while rating the album 7.2 out of 10. In her review for AllMusic, Heather Phares declared that on the album, Jonna Lee "takes a lighter, more hopeful - and more purely pop - approach." She further stated that she "doesn't sacrifice any of her music's complexity" and "carefully balances the album's more direct songs with spacious interludes that suggest spaces to confront and embrace the hope and fear that come with the unknown."

Track listing

 Notes
 All tracks stylised in all caps, except "I Keep" stylised as "i KEEP".

Personnel
Credits adapted from the liner notes of Remember the Future.

Musicians

 ionnalee – vocals, instruments
 Zola Jesus  – vocals 
 Jennie Abrahamson  – vocals 
 Claes Björklund – instruments 
 Tungorna – instruments ; additional instruments ; vocals 
 Svein Berge – instruments 
 Torbjørn Brundtland – instruments 
 Johannes Berglund  – additional instruments

Technical personnel

 ionnalee – production ; co-production ; mixing ; mastering 
 Claes Björklund – production ; co-production ; mixing 
 Röyksopp – production 
 Johannes Berglund – mixing 
 Sören von Malmborg – mastering

Artwork

 ionnalee – art direction, robot, costume
 Comme des Garçons – costume
 John Strandh – photography
 Jacob Hulmston – graphic design

Release history

Notes

References

2019 albums
Jonna Lee (singer) albums